Day6 (stylized in all caps) is a South Korean pop rock band under the label JYP Entertainment. The group debuted on September 7, 2015, with the EP The Day, which peaked at No.2 on Billboards World Album Chart a week following its release. The band consists of four members: Sungjin, Young K, Wonpil and Dowoon. Originally a six-piece band, Junhyeok departed on February 27, 2016, and Jae departed on December 31, 2021. All of the Day6 members are heavily involved in writing, composing and producing the band's music.

In 2017, the band released two songs every month of the year for their Every Day6 project. By the end of the project, 25 songs were added to their discography, with genres ranging from hard rock and upbeat sing-a-longs to mellow ballads. Their first full-length album, Sunrise, consisted of songs released in the first half of the Every Day6 project. It was number 14 on Billboards The 25 Greatest K-Pop Albums of the 2010s: Staff List, and the project kick-off song "I Wait" was placed No.81 on Billboards The 100 Greatest K-Pop Songs of the 2010s: Staff List.

History

2014–2016: Formation, debut and further releases

JYP Entertainment initially announced the debut of a five-member band called 5LIVE, composed of Sungjin, Jae, Young K, Junhyeok, and Wonpil. In 2014, the band began promotions by appearing on the fourth episode of Mnet's reality-survival program Who is Next: Win and releasing a song titled "Lovely Girl" as part of the original soundtrack of 2013 TV series Bel Ami.

In mid-2015, drummer Dowoon joined the line-up and the band was renamed Day6.

Day6 released their debut EP, The Day, with the lead single "Congratulations" on September 7, 2015, marking their debut. The album charted at No.2 on Billboards World Album Chart a week following its release.

Day6 held their first live concert D-Day for 2 nights in November 21–22, 2015 at YES24 MUVhall. Aside from performing songs from their debut album, the band also did multiple covers and played some unreleased materials of theirs.

On October 18, 2015, Day6 held their first overseas showcase in Taiwan, which was also their first overseas schedule, at ATT Show Box.

On December 5, 2015, Day6 held their first overseas fanmeeting in Singapore at the Marina Bay Sands Convention Centre.

On February 27, 2016, JYP Entertainment stated that Junhyeok had departed from the band due to personal reasons and terminated his contract with the company. Day6 continued as a five-member band.

On March 30, 2016, Day6 released their second EP, Daydream, with the lead single "Letting Go". On March 31, Day6 made their official stage debut on the music program M Countdown, six months after their initial debut. Following the release, the band held their second live concert Dream for 2 nights on May 28–29, 2016 at YES24 Live Hall, and one night overseas in Bangkok, Thailand at the Thunder Dome.

2017: Every Day6 project

On December 29, 2016, Day6 announced their upcoming monthly project in 2017 titled Every Day6, in which the band would release two songs every month on the sixth along with concerts prior to the song's release, music videos, and 4 fixed V Live broadcasts. 

Day6 released their first monthly single with the release of lead single "I Wait" and sidetrack "Goodbye Winter" on January 6, 2017. Their second monthly single was released with the lead single  "You Were Beautiful" and sidetrack "My Day" on February 6.

Their third monthly single with the lead single "How Can I Say" and sidetrack "I Would" was released on March 6. They also promoted on the music program M Countdown on March 9. Their fourth monthly single consisting of the lead single  "I'm Serious" and sidetrack "Say Wow" was released on April 6. They also promoted on M Countdown the same day. Their fifth monthly single was released on May 8, with the lead single "Dance Dance" and sidetrack "Man in a Movie".

In June 2017, Day6 released their first full-length album, Sunrise, with a total of 14 tracks. It consists of the releases from January to May, the rebooted version of "Letting Go", the final version of "Congratulations", and two new tracks: "I Smile" (the lead single of the album) and "Lean On Me". Day6 also announced their official fanclub name, "My Day", the same day.

Their July single consisting of the lead single "Hi Hello" and sidetrack "Be Lazy" was released on July 6. Their August single consisting of the lead single "What Can I Do" and sidetrack "Whatever!" released on August 7. Their September single with the lead single "I Loved You" and sidetrack "I'll Remember" released on September 6. Day6 originally would released their October single on October 7 and later installment to released on September 29, which consists of the lead single "When You Love Someone" and the sidetrack "I Need Somebody". The music videos of their August, September, and October singles were a three-part story about high school friendship and love.

Day6 held their North American meet and greet tour, Day6 Live & Meet in North America 2017, hosted by SubKulture Entertainment. The tour started in Los Angeles on October 20, Austin on October 22, New York on October 24, Detroit on October 27, and stopped in Toronto on October 29.

Their November single consisting of the lead single "All Alone" and sidetrack "Pouring" was released on November 6. On November 28, JYP Entertainment announced the band's first nationwide tour in 2018, Every Day6 Concert Nationwide Tour. The tour started in Busan on January 20–21, Daegu on January 27 and stopped in Daejeon on February 10.

On December 6, Day6 official concluded their monthly project with the releases of their second full-length album, Moonrise. The album contained the previous releases from July to November, the lead single "I Like You", two sidetrack ("Better Better" and "I'll Try"), and the final versions of the B-sides from their debut EP The Day.

2018: Youth series, Japanese debut and first world tour
Day6 official announced the recruitment of their first generation fan club from January 5 to 25.

Day6 made their official debut in Japan on March 14 with their first Japanese single, "If (Mata Aetara)". The single also serves as theme song for the Japanese drama Repeat. The music video for the single was released on February 2.

Day6 held their Every Day6 Finale Concert - The Best Moments on March 3 and 4 in the Olympic Hall.

In April 2018, Day6 announced their first Japanese concert, Day6 1st Live in Japan 'The Best Day' on June 13 at Tsutaya O-East in Tokyo.

In May 2018, it was announced that Day6 would release their second Japanese single, "Stop the Rain", on July 25, which was produced by Japanese guitarist Ubukata Shinichi (member of ELLEGARDEN and Nothing's Carved In Stone).

In June 2018, Day6 released their first greatest hits album in Japan, The Best Day, which is composed of the band's previous Korean singles and three new-version tracks: "Congratulations" (English Ver.), "I Wait" (Japanese Ver.), and "You Were Beautiful" (English Ver.).

On June 26, Day6 released their third EP Shoot Me: Youth Part 1. The EP contains seven tracks, with the lead single titled "Shoot Me". The second part, Remember Us: Youth Part 2, was released on December 10 with the lead single "days gone by". On October 17, 2018, between the release of the two parts, their first Japanese studio album Unlock was released.

Day6 went on their first world tour, titled Youth, subsequently performing in 24 cities in Asia, Australia, North America and Europe from June 22, 2018, to January 29, 2019.

2019–2021: The Book of Us series, second world tour, first sub-unit, and Jae's departure

On January 10, 2019, the Day6 YouTube account announced that recruitment for their second-generation fan club would begin that month.

Day6 released their fifth extended play The Book of Us: Gravity on July 15, 2019. They received their first-ever music show win on July 24. They embarked on their second world tour Gravity on August 9.

On October 22, they released their third Korean-language studio album, The Book of Us: Entropy. On December 4, they released their second compilation album The Best Day2.

On April 27, 2020, JYP Entertainment announced that Day6 would be releasing a new album titled The Book of Us: The Demon on May 11. The day before the album's scheduled release, JYP Entertainment announced that Day6 would be taking a temporary hiatus to focus on their health. Although Day6 is temporarily halting group activities, the band still released their EP The Book of Us: The Demon on May 11 at 6 p.m. KST. The lead single "Zombie" debuted at No. 8 on Melon's realtime chart at 7 p.m. KST and rose as high as No. 4 at 1 a.m. KST on May 12. "Zombie" also went up to No. 1 spot after debuting No. 2 in Bugs. In addition, all seven B-side tracks from the album have been charting in the top 100 on Melon, Bugs, and Genie since the album's release. 

In August 2020, JYP Entertainment announced Day6's first subunit, Even of Day, composed of Young K, Wonpil and Dowoon, which debuted on August 31 with their EP The Book of Us: Gluon, which produced the single "Where the Sea Sleeps." Even of Day partook in the first segment of web music show Secret Atelier where they released a single, "So, This Is Love," on January 15, 2021, as a result of the show. On January 24, Even of Day held their first online concert, Online Party Night: The Arcane Salon.

It was announced in February 26 that Day6 would make a full group comeback in April 2021. On March 8, 2021, Sungjin announced during his a V Live broadcast that he would be enlisting for his mandatory military service on the same day, having already recorded for the upcoming album.  Day6 released their seventh extended play The Book of Us: Negentropy and its lead single "You Make Me" on April 19; the album marked the final installment of The Book of Us series. Due to Sungjin's military enlistment, the group decided that they would not be doing album promotions for The Book of Us: Negentropy.

On July 5, 2021, Even of Day returned with their second EP, Right Through Me and its lead single of the same name. Young K debuted as Day6's second soloist with his first extended play, Eternal, on September 6.  He also enlisted in the military on October 12, where he will be serving in KATUSA.  Dowoon debuted as Day6's third soloist with his first digital single, "Out of the Blue", on September 27, which is a duet with Song Heejin.  

On December 31, 2021, Jae announced via Twitter that he will be taking a hiatus from his promotions as a member of the band. The same day, JYPE announced that he will be leaving the band and ending his exclusive contract with JYP Entertainment due to personal reasons.

2022–present: Military service
Dowoon became the third member of the band to enlist in the military on January 17, 2022.

On February 7, 2022, Wonpil debuted as Day6's fourth soloist with his first studio album, Pilmography.  He enlisted as a member of the Republic of Korea Navy on March 28.

On September 6, 2022, it was confirmed that Sungjin, who would be the first member to be discharged from the military, would retire from military service on September 7.

On September 26, 2022, all members of Day6 renewed their contracts with JYP Entertainment.

On April 11, 2023, Young K will become the second member to be discharged from military service as a KATUSA soldier.

Members
List of members and roles.

 Sungjin – leader, main vocals, guitar
 Young K – bass, rap, vocals
 Wonpil – synthesizer, vocals
 Dowoon – drums

Former members
 Jae – guitar, vocals, raps
Junhyeok – keyboard, vocals

Discography 

 Sunrise (2017)
 Moonrise (2017)
 Unlock (2018)
 The Book of Us: Entropy (2019)

Filmography

Tours and concerts

Headlining concerts
 Day6 Live Concert "D-Day" (2015)
 Day6 Live Concert "Dream" (2016)
 Every Day6 Concerts (2017–2018)
 Day6 1st Live in Japan "The Best Day" (2018)
 Day6 Christmas Special Concert "The Present" (2018, 2019)

Headlining tours
 Day6 First World Tour "Youth" (2018-2019)
 Day6 2nd Live Tour in Japan (2018)
 Day6 2nd World Tour "Gravity" (2019-2020)

Awards and nominations

References

External links

 Day6 Official Website

2015 establishments in South Korea
JYP Entertainment artists
K-pop music groups
Musical groups established in 2015
Musical groups from Seoul
South Korean rock music groups
South Korean pop rock music groups